The Purulia Pumped Storage Project is a pumped storage hydroelectric power plant, located at Purulia district of West Bengal, India. The Ajodhya Hills offered suitable terrain for construction of upper and lower reservoirs.

Construction 
The project is constructed on Kistobazar nullah which is a tributary of Sobha nullah in Ajodhya Hills. The project was planned to be commissioned in 2002-03, but litigations during tender stage and difficulties in getting clearance for forested land caused delays to the project. Japan International Cooperation Agency (JICA) provided  of loan assistant for the project.

The local villagers protested against the project, as the villagers alleged massive loss of vegetation in the area and hundreds of villagers allegedly lost their livelihoods.

Purpose 
The objective of project is to meet load demand by producing power through the turbines at the peak load time and utilize surplus power available of the system during off peak time by pumping the water to upper reservoir, thus achieving the flatter load demand curve and maintaining the frequency.

It is operated not only to help meet the peak loads but also as a short term operating reserve (STOR), providing a fast response to short-term rapid changes in power demand, both hike and drop, or sudden loss of power generating stations. On 5 April, 2020 when people switched off their lights at 9 PM by request of Prime Minister Narendra Modi for solidarity in fight against COVID-19 pandemic, the West Bengal grid load was expected to dropped by 1 GW. While the national grid load was estimated to drop by 12 - 14 GW, far from the estimate the national grid power demand was dropped 31 GW in a span of 25 minutes. Out of 31,089 MW of power drop 17,543 MW of power was adjusted by hydro power facility across the country, While Purulia pumped storage adjusted about 700 MW of power drop by ramping down its generation to zero, Hydropower facility across the country played vital role for maintaining grid frequency.

Due to the increase in renewable power like solar and wind, the intermittency of power generation is increasing in India. Considering the future prospects another pumped storage projects at Turga (Purulia district, West Bengal) and Nilgiris (Tamil Nadu) are in planning phase.

Capacity 
The installed capacity is 900 MW (4*225 MW).

See also 

 List of pumped-storage hydroelectric power stations
 List of energy storage projects

References

External links 
 Purulia Pumped Storage detail specification
 Report-on-Pan-India-Lights-Off-Event-9-PM-9-Minutes-on-5th-April-2020

Rock-filled dams
Dams completed in 2008
Energy infrastructure completed in 2008
Dams in West Bengal
Pumped-storage hydroelectric power stations in India